Poecilobothrus majesticus is an extinct species of fly in the family Dolichopodidae. It was endemic to Great Britain. The species is known from a single specimen collected from the Essex coast in 1907, and was formally described by E. C. M. d'Assis-Fonseca in 1976. It has not been recorded for over 100 years, so it is therefore considered to be extinct.

References

Dolichopodinae
Insects described in 1976
Extinct insects since 1500
Endemic fauna of England
Extinct animals in the United Kingdom